2010 Kashima Antlers season

Competitions

Player statistics

Other pages
 J. League official site

Kashima Antlers
Kashima Antlers seasons